The boxing competition at the 2011 Arafura Games was contested between male and female competitors and was held in Darwin, Australia from May 6 at the Marrara Sporting Complex. The event saw the majority of the Oceanian nations and the Southeast Asian countries plus India taking part. In the Women’s boxing saw altogether 49 fighters that competed in nine weight divisions from 48 up to 81kg.

Schedule

Medal summary

Medal table

Events

References

2011 in boxing
Boxing in Australia
Arafura Games